The Skyscraper is a 66 storey,  tall skyscraper in Business Bay, Dubai, United Arab Emirates.

See also 
 List of tallest buildings in Dubai

Gallery
The tower and gallery has been under construction.

References

External links
Emporis
CTBUH

Proposed skyscrapers in Dubai